Pétervására is a town in Heves county, Hungary. It is famous for its Keglevich Castle.

Pétervására features Medici lion statues (of unknown origin).

Twin towns – sister cities
Pétervására is twinned with:

  Jesenské, Slovakia  
  Fântânele, Romania

References

External links

  in Hungarian

Populated places in Heves County